Thee Headcoatees  were an all-female garage band formed in Chatham, Kent, England in 1991. They were part of the Medway scene. The members were Holly Golightly, Kyra LaRubia, Ludella Black and "Bongo" Debbie Green.

Formation
Thee Headcoatees were formed by Billy Childish as a backing group for his band Thee Headcoats. Ludella Black's previous band The Delmonas had performed the same function for Childish's earlier bands, starting with The Milkshakes. Their songs were principally written by Billy Childish and were songs that did not suit his own acts. After Holly Golightly did a cameo appearance with Thee Headcoats, Childish added her to The Delmonas lineup; soon thereafter the band was renamed Thee Headcoatees.

History
As a backing band Thee Headcoatees initially would just do a few songs to warm up for Thee Headcoats. Their song "Headcoat Girl" on The Sisters of Suave even states "I wanna be a headcoat girl". In 1991 the band cut their first album Girlsville for Hangman Records. It consisted of songs written by Billy Childish and covers of songs by The Kinks (Last Plane Home), The Beatles (Run For Your Life), The Tamrons (Wild Man) and more. In 1998 Debbie Green left the band, which was reduced to a three piece for their final album, Here Comes Cessation. Thee Headcoatees continued to tour with Thee Headcoats until the group folded in 1999.

Post break-up
Holly Golightly has gone on to pursue a solo career, recording more than ten LPs, and has worked with the bands The Greenhornes and The White Stripes and in her latter career has formed the band Holly Golightly & The Brokeoffs. Kyra and Debbie went on to sing for The A Lines (featuring Delia from Mambo Taxi and Julie Hamper of Billy Childish's Musicians of the British Empire); Debbie and Delia currently play in Ye Nuns. Kyra and Ludella later appeared in The Shall I Say Quois alongside Julie Hamper, while Debbie also went on to play with Dutronc, Baby Birkin and The Speed of Sound; she also drummed and sang with Would-Be-Goods, and recorded in The Buffets, alongside Hamper.

Album discography
Girlsville (1991)
Have Love Will Travel (1992)
Ballad Of The Insolent Pup (1994)
Bozstik Haze (1997)
Punk Girls (1997)
Here Comes Cessation (1999)
The Sisters Of Suave (1999) [singles compilation]

References

External links
Complete discography

English punk rock groups
British indie rock groups
English girl groups
Garage punk groups
All-female bands
Musical groups established in 1991
1991 establishments in England
Musical groups disestablished in 1999
1999 disestablishments in England
Musical groups from Kent